The following lists events that happened during 1995 in Australia.

Incumbents

Monarch – Elizabeth II
Governor General – Bill Hayden
Prime Minister –  Paul Keating
Deputy Prime Minister – Brian Howe (until 20 June), then Kim Beazley
Opposition Leader – Alexander Downer (until 30 January), then John Howard
Chief Justice – Sir Anthony Mason (until 20 April), then Sir Gerard Brennan

State and Territory Leaders
Premier of New South Wales – John Fahey (until 4 April), then Bob Carr
Opposition Leader – Bob Carr (until 4 April), then Peter Collins
Premier of Queensland – Wayne Goss
Opposition Leader – Rob Borbidge
Premier of South Australia – Dean Brown
Opposition Leader – Mike Rann
Premier of Tasmania – Ray Groom
Opposition Leader – Michael Field
Premier of Victoria – Jeff Kennett
Opposition Leader – John Brumby
Premier of Western Australia – Richard Court
Opposition Leader – Jim McGinty
Chief Minister of the Australian Capital Territory – Rosemary Follett (until 2 March), then Kate Carnell
Opposition Leader – Kate Carnell (until 2 March), then Rosemary Follett
Chief Minister of the Northern Territory – Marshall Perron (until 26 May), then Shane Stone
Opposition Leader – Brian Ede
Head of Government of Norfolk Island – Michael King

Governors and Administrators
Governor of New South Wales – Peter Sinclair
Governor of Queensland – Leneen Forde
Governor of South Australia – Dame Roma Mitchell
Governor of Tasmania – Sir Phillip Bennett (until 2 October), then Sir Guy Green
Governor of Victoria – Richard McGarvie
Governor of Western Australia – Michael Jeffery
Administrator of the Australian Indian Ocean Territories – Danny Gillespie
Administrator of Norfolk Island – Alan Kerr
Administrator of the Northern Territory – Austin Asche

Events

January
23 January – The Tasmanian Conservation Foundation commences court proceedings to overturn 2 of the 11 woodchip licenses issued by the Federal Government.
30 January – John Howard becomes federal Liberal Party leader and thus federal leader of the opposition after the resignation of Alexander Downer.

February
2 February – Tasmanian Premier Ray Groom defies Prime Minister Paul Keating's moratorium on logging in 72 Tasmanian coupes.
3 February – A 4-day blockade of Parliament House, Canberra by 300 trucks and 2,500 timber workers and supporters ends as Prime Minister Paul Keating partially backs down on his 27 January decision to freeze logging in 509 old-growth coupes.
13 February – 2,000 rally at Sydney Airport causing disruption.
16 February – 
Media magnate Kerry Packer appears on Channel 9's A Current Affair to attack cross-media ownership, and speaks of John Howard as prime minister material.
Federal Opposition Leader John Howard promises to woo "the battlers", traditional Labor voters hurt by Labor's policies, and "demonstrate that our policies are not antagonistic to them".  
17 February – Prime Minister Paul Keating attacks John Howard as a "political blancmange" and a "political chameleon".
18 February – Elections in the Australian Capital Territory replace the minority Australian Labor Party government of Rosemary Follett and elect a minority Liberal Party government of Kate Carnell.

March
10 March – 
Ian McLachlan resigns his shadow portfolio of Environment for having misled Parliament over the opening of secret Aboriginal women's documents relating to the proposed construction of a bridge to Hindmarsh Island, South Australia.
The New South Wales Government announces 7 new parks and reserves, adding 6,000 hectares to the New South Wales National Parks estate.
18 March – The campaign to save the Tarkine wilderness achieves success a week after the arrest of Trish Caswell, Australian Conservation Foundation Executive Director, for trespass, when Australian Heritage Commission Chair, Wendy McCarthy, announces its interim listing for May.
25 March – 
Bob Carr leads the Labor Party to victory in the New South Wales state election, deposing the Liberal/National coalition government of John Fahey that had been in power since 1988.  Labor scraped in with a 2.2% swing and 50 of the 99 seats.
Liberal candidate Brendan Smyth wins the 1995 Canberra by-election with a 16% swing, a formerly safe Labor seat occupied by Ros Kelly.

April
4 April – 
New South Wales Premier Bob Carr assumes the Arts and Ethnic Affairs portfolio and Deputy Premier Andrew Refshauge assumes Health and Aboriginal Affairs.
Peter Collins replaces John Fahey as New South Wales Liberal leader.  Ron Phillps beats incumbent Kerry Chikarovski as Deputy Leader by 19:10.
11 April – The Council of Australian Governments (COAG) meeting is held.  The assembled Premiers and territory leaders endorse a program of reforms envisaged by Professor Fred Hilmer's National Competition Policy Review. 
May – The Australian Grand Prix is moved from Adelaide to Melbourne after the Premier of Victoria spends what is reported to be quite a large amount on securing the rights to the race from 1996 onwards. Protests ensue about what many saw as the turning of public parkland into a private racetrack.
28 April – Rob O'Regan retires after 3 years at the helm of the Criminal Justice Commission (CJC) in Queensland, critical of poor standards of conduct among many politicians.

May
9 May – The Federal Budget is delivered.  The Budget's enormous turnaround in projected revenue, from a deficit of $12.9 billion to a small surplus, is received with scepticism by many commentators.
 30 May –  Dorothy Davis disappeared.

June
June–July – Qantas is privatised.
7 June – Prime Minister Paul Keating announces to Parliament that Australia would have a referendum on the republic with a head of state elected by Parliament by a majority of at least two-thirds.
8 June – The Tasmanian Labor Party and unions reach a historic agreement to overturn the Groom industrial relations regime if Labor wins office.
20 June – The Federal Labor Caucus selects Kim Beazley to replace Brian Howe who unexpectedly stepped down as deputy leader.
30 June – Democrats Leader Cheryl Kernot launches the Democrats' "Keeping the Senate Strong" campaign, attacking the "anarchical" Greens.

July
1 July – Telecom Australia changes its domestic trading name to Telstra.
15 July – The 1995 Queensland state election produces a hung Parliament, with Labor holding a one-seat majority over the Liberal/National coalition, as well as suffering a 7% swing and the loss of 9 seats. 
17 July – The West Australian Government's Royal Commission into former West Australian Premier Carmen Lawrence's role in the Easton affair opens in Perth, Western Australia, an inquiry earlier labelled by Prime Minister Paul Keating as a "flagrant abuse of the judicial system".
25 July – The count in Mundingburra is complete.  Labor wins by 16 votes, with Labor claiming a one-seat victory (45 seats), Nationals won 29 seats, Liberals won 14 seats and 1 Independent.

August
2 August – A combined Queensland Opposition Coalition frontbench is announced, with Joan Sheldon as Deputy Leader and Shadow Treasurer.
5 August – Federal Opposition Leader John Howard expels Noel Crichton-Browne from the Federal Liberal party room.
7 August – A second West Australian Federal MP leaves the Liberal Party to sit as an Independent, following the bitter power struggle in the West Australian branch.
16 August – New South Wales Premier Bob Carr concedes that his pre-election promise to lift the tolls on the M4 and M5 tollways in western Sydney would be abandoned as being impossibly expensive.
25 August – Labor's National Executive bans ALP members from associating with the right-wing League of Rights.  When maverick Kalgoorlie MP, Graeme Campbell, persists in his association and espousal of anti-immigration views embarrassing to the party, his pre-selection is revoked, causing him to resign.
31 August –  The cast bronze statue of the dog Larry La Trobe situated on the northern end of Melbourne's City Square is stolen.
 1 to 31 August – Sydney's official Observatory Hill weather station records its driest and only rainless month since records began in 1859. At the close of the month the city had gone 46 days without measurable rain, twelve more than the previous record from 1970 and 1975.

September
8 September – Noel Crichton-Browne is expelled from the Liberal Party.
13 September – The Queensland Government abandons the controversial Eastern Tollway to link Brisbane with the Gold Coast, having lost 4 seats in the affected area.

October
11 October – John Fahey is selected as Liberal candidate for the marginal seat of Macarthur.
20 October – Brenda Hodge, the last person to be sentenced to death in Australia before the full abolition of capital punishment, is paroled from prison after serving eleven years of a life sentence.
24 October – Anna Wood, a 15-year-old schoolgirl from Sydney, dies after taking ecstasy at a rave. Her death sparks a media firestorm and a national debate over the use of illicit drugs.

November
November – The rabbit calicivirus disease (RCD) escapes from an island testing station in South Australia & quickly spreads into Victoria. It is estimated that the feral rabbit population would be permanently reduced by 60%.
1 November – Federal Opposition Leader John Howard attempts to mend relations with the Asian community, telling Chinese business people in Melbourne how he values their commercial networks.
3 November- After a six-month trial, David Harold Eastman is convicted by a jury of the assassination of Australian Federal Police Assistant Commissioner Colin Winchester. He is sentenced to life imprisonment and can only be released by approval of the ACT parliament, Federal Parliament and the Governor-General.
7 November – The Federal Court of Australia rules against Minister Tickner's ban on the building of a bridge to Hindmarsh Island in South Australia.
14 November – Commissioner Marks delivers his final report, damning Carmen Lawrence's role in the Easton affair, the weight of her colleagues' evidence being against her version.
15 November – Legislation decriminalising owning or working in a brothel is passed by the New South Wales Legislative Council, thereby fulfilling the recommendations of the Wood police corruption inquiry.
20 November – South Australian Democrat and former leader Senator John Coulter resigns due to ill health, warning Cheryl Kernot that the party risked losing votes by becoming too mainstream.  John Coulter is replaced by former student activist and party worker Natasha Stott Despoja.
26 November – The Australian Women's Party is launched in Brisbane, Queensland by a group which includes disenchanted Labor women.

December
1 December – A new licence for a trial shipment of 200,000 tonnes of woodchips to Taiwan reignites plans for a "Son of Wesley Vale" pulp mill for northern Tasmania.
3 December – The Anzac Bridge in Sydney is opened to traffic.
4 December – A gas explosion at Kogarah railway station, Sydney kills two people.
7 December – A full bench of the Federal Court of Australia rejects Minister Tickner's appeal against their 7 November ruling.
8 December – In the Court of Disputed Returns, Mr. Justice Brian Ambrose orders a fresh election in Mundingburra, Queensland after finding some 22 soldiers serving in Rwanda had effectively been disenfranchised in the 1995 Queensland state election.
10 December – Tasmanian Premier Ray Groom hands back to Tasmania's indigenous people 12 sacred and cultural sites totalling 3,800 hectares in an historic ceremony at Kidson Cove.
15 December – The Queensland Labor Party replaces former member and current candidate for Mundingburra, Ken Davies, with Townsville Mayor Tony Mooney, provoking a voter backlash.
21 December – South Australian Royal Commissioner, Iris Stevens finds that Aboriginal women had "fabricated" beliefs on which they grounded opposition to the building of the Hindmarsh bridge.

Film
 Angel Baby
 Babe
 Hotel Sorrento

Television
January – Today Tonight debuts on the Seven Network, Hey Hey It's Saturday returns, debuts and starts in 1995 without Ossie Ostrich as Ernie Carroll, who was Graham Kennedy's on-screenwriter from the early IMT days, retired at the end of 1994.
Pay television arrives in Australia with Foxtel & Optus Vision launching in the metropolitan areas & Galaxy & Austar launching in regional areas that year.
May – Kerry Stokes becomes chairman of the Seven Network after reaching 20% ownership of the company.
STW-9 is purchased by Sunraysia Television after a fierce bidding war with WIN Television.
July – Cheez TV begins on the Ten network. It later became a huge hit and eventually made Agro's Cartoon Connection end in 1997.

Sport
International rugby league representative forward Ian Roberts became the first high-profile Australian sports person and first rugby footballer in the world to come out to the public as gay.
The newly-founded North Queensland Cowboys and Auckland Warriors, as well as the previously-founded Western Reds and South Queensland Crushers, all debut in the 1995 ARL season, bringing the total number of clubs to 20.
2 March – First day of the Australian Track & Field Championships for the 1994–1995 season, which are held at the Sydney Athletic Field in Sydney. The men's 10,000 metres events were conducted in conjunction with the Zatopek Meet at Melbourne, Victoria on 15 December 1994.
31 March – The Super League war begins. Lightning raids begin across the country to sign players on vastly inflated contracts. The Kerry Packer backed ARL responds by signing 50 players onto equally inflated contracts on 2 April.
7 May – Melbourne Knights dispel their tag of chokers by upsetting defending champions Adelaide City 2–0 in the NSL Grand Final at Hindmarsh Stadium.
15 May – The Paul Vautin-coached Maroons win the opening Rugby League State of Origin match 2–0 at the Sydney Football Stadium. The win is all the more amazing as the team is made up largely of relatively unknown players, thanks to most star players having signed with Super League.
9 July – Manly-Warringah set a record of fifteen consecutive wins to open an NSWRL/ARL season.
16 July – Roderic deHighden wins the men's national marathon title, clocking 2:13:58 in Brisbane, while Julie Rose claims the women's title in 2:38:44.
2 September – The Sturt Football Club completes the longest winless season in the history of major Australian football leagues, with a record of 0-22 and a minimum losing margin of 24 points.
24 September – The Canterbury Bulldogs (playing as the Sydney Bulldogs) defeat the minor premiers Manly-Warringah Sea Eagles 17–4 to win the 88th NSWRL/ARL premiership. The debuting North Queensland Cowboys finish in last position, claiming the wooden spoon.
25 September – Opening arguments are heard in the ARL/SL case in the Federal Court, which will decide the future of rugby league in Australia.
30 September – The Carlton Blues (21.15.141) defeat the Geelong Football Club (11.14.80) to win the 99th VFL/AFL premiership. It is a record 16th premiership for Carlton.
12 November – After 10 years, the last Australian Grand Prix takes place on the streets of Adelaide. Damon Hill, of the Williams team, wins. The race moves to Albert Park in Melbourne from 1996 onwards.

Births

January 
 6 January – Paul Izzo, footballer
 13 January – Brianna Davey, soccer and football player
 15 January 
 Christopher Cristaldo, footballer
 Liam Knight, rugby league player 
 16 January – Mikaela Turik, cricketer
 18 January 
 Jack Miller, motorcycle racer
 Dylan Murnane, footballer
 21 January – Alanna Kennedy, soccer player
 24 January – Callan McAuliffe, actor
 26 January – Jordan Drew, footballer 
 31 January – Taylor Corry, swimmer

February 
 11 February – Alex Haas, canoeist
 18 February – Mitchell Oxborrow, British-born soccer player

March 
 20 March – Jack Bird, rugby league player

April 
 4 April – Jacob Melling, soccer player
 8 April – Hagi Gligor, footballer
 11 April – Sarah Mason, New Zealand-born surfer
 12 April – Angela Donald, artistic gymnast
 21 April – Matt Crouch, footballer
 25 April – Scott Galloway, footballer
 27 April – Nick Kyrgios, tennis player

May 
 4 May – Chris Ikonomidis, footballer
 5 May 
 James Connor, diver
 Anthony Spanos, actor 
 11 May – Erinn Walters, athlete

June 
 4 June – Troye Sivan, singer-songwriter and actor
 15 June 
 Ben Garuccio, footballer
 Arthur Sissis, motorcycle racer
 18 June – Olia Burtaev, swimmer
 23 June – Eva Lazzaro, actress
 30 June – Jai Opetaia, boxer

July 
 5 July – Torita Isaac, athlete
 6 July – Brooklee Han, American-born figure skater
 12 July – Evania Pelite, rugby union player
 13 July – Dante Exum, basketball player
 28 July – Josh Addo-Carr, rugby league player

August 
 19 August – Dylan Phythian, rugby league player

September 
 14 September – Anton de Pasquale, motor racing driver
 15 September – Awer Mabil, Kenya-born footballer
 25 September – Todd Hazelwood, motor racing driver
 26 September – Kyle Laybutt, rugby league player
 29 September – Yolane Kukla, swimmer

October 
 3 October – Jay Andrijic, tennis player
 7 October – Tiffany Eliadis, soccer player
 12 October – Stefan Mauk, footballer

November 
 1 November – Nick D'Aloisio, entrepreneur, computer programmer and designer
 7 November – Michael Dameski, actor, dancer and singer
 23 November – Brittany Broben, diver
 29 November – Liv Hewson, actress and playwright

December 
 2 December – Joe Stimson, rugby league player
 20 December – Feliks Zemdegs, speedsolver
 22 December – Holly Ferling, cricketer

Deaths
13 January – Max Harris, 74, poet and author
26 January – Ian Tomlinson, 58, triple and long jumper
2 February – Fred Perry, 85, British tennis player
5 March – Gregg Hansford, 42, motorcycle and touring car racer
6 March – Olive Zakharov, 75, ALP senator
11 March – Isabel Letham, 95, Australia's first surfer
29 March – Antony Hamilton, 42, actor, model and dancer
2 April – Trevor Ashmore Pyman, diplomat
24 April – Stanley Burbury, 85, 21st Governor of Tasmania
27 April – Peter Wright, 78, British MI5 officer and author of Spycatcher
12 May – Len Beadell, 72, explorer and roadbuilder
17 May – Frank Knopfelmacher, 72, philosopher
12 June – Sir Talbot Duckmanton, 73, ABC general manager (1965–82)
26 June – John Jefferson Bray, 82, SA Supreme Court judge
22 July – Harold Larwood, 90, English cricketer
2 August – Fred Daly, 82, ALP politician
8 August – Harold Stewart, 78, poet and author
10 August – Ray Whittorn, Victorian politician (b. 1911)
17 August – Ted Whitten, 62, AFL player
18 August – Philip Hodgins, 36, poet
27 August – Dick Bentley, 88, comedian and actor
30 August – Dame Pattie Menzies, 94, wife of Prime Minister Sir Robert Menzies
24 October – Anna Wood, 15, victim of water intoxication after taking ecstasy
26 October – John Sangster, 66, jazz musician
1 November – Sir James Ralph Darling, 96, headmaster of Geelong Grammar School and chairman of the ABC
10 November – Jim Willis, 85, botanist
5 December – Gwen Harwood, 75, poet
8 December – Arthur John Birch, 80, organic chemist
12 December – Andrew Olle, 48, ABC TV journalist

See also
 1995 in Australian television
 List of Australian films of 1995

References

 
Australia
Years of the 20th century in Australia